The Building at 1–7 Moscow Street in Quincy, Massachusetts, is a rare turn-of-the-20th century wood frame apartment house.  It was built in the first decade of the 20th century, and is a long rectangular -story wood-frame structure, with two sets of paired entranceways  The gambrel projections over the entrances are a hallmark of the Shingle style, but its original wood shingle finish has been replaced by modern siding (see photo).

The building was listed on the National Register of Historic Places in 1989.

See also
National Register of Historic Places listings in Quincy, Massachusetts

References

Buildings and structures in Quincy, Massachusetts
Apartment buildings on the National Register of Historic Places in Massachusetts
Queen Anne architecture in Massachusetts
Shingle Style architecture in Massachusetts
National Register of Historic Places in Quincy, Massachusetts